John J. Shumaker (March 13, 1929 - October 13, 1999) was an American politician from Pennsylvania who served as a Republican member of the Pennsylvania State Senate for the 15th district from 1983 to 1995.  He was born in Harrisburg, Pennsylvania.  He died on October 13, 1999 and is interred at the Indiantown Gap National Cemetery in Annville, Pennsylvania.

Legacy
In 1988, the Senator John J. Shumaker Public Safety Center was opened just north of the Harrisburg Area Community College Harrisburg campus and named in his honor.

References

1929 births
1999 deaths
20th-century American politicians
Burials in Pennsylvania
Republican Party Pennsylvania state senators